Études is a one-act ballet choreographed by Danish dancer and choreographer Harald Lander to piano studies by Carl Czerny arranged for orchestra by Knudåge Riisager. It is considered Lander's most famous choreographic work and brought him international fame. The work premiered on 15 January 1948 at the Royal Danish Theatre in Copenhagen with the Royal Danish Ballet, with scenery and costumes by Rolf Gerard and lighting by Nananne Porcher.

Études is considered an homage to classical ballet training. It begins with traditional ballet exercises at the barre and ends with spectacular bravura displays.

The original cast included:  Margot Lander, Hans Brenaa, Svend Erik Jensen, Inge Sand and Inge Goth. Its ABT premiere at the 54th Street Theatre in New York took place on 5 October 1961 and featured dancers Toni Lander, Royes Fernandez, Bruce Marks, Eleanor D'Antuono and Elisabeth Carroll.

Sections 
The order of the various sections of the ballet, as recorded by the Danish National Radio Symphony Orchestra and conducted by Gennady Rozhdestvensky in 1997, include:

Overture (exercises at the barre)
Tendus, Grands battements, fondus and frappes
Ronds de jambe
Silhouetter-au milieu
Adagio
Port de Bras et pas de badin
Mirror Dance
Ensemble
Romantic Pas de deux
Sortie
Conclusion
Pirouettes
Releves
Piques et grands pirouettes
Solo for the Prima Ballerina
Coda
Small Leaps
Mazurka
Tarantella
Broad Leaps (Finale)

References
Notes

Sources
 Terry, Walter (1976). Ballet Guide. New York: Dodd, Mead & Co. 

Ballets by Harald Lander
Ballets by Carl Czerny
1948 ballet premieres